Thorne Bay Seaplane Base  is a state-owned public-use seaplane base serving Thorne Bay, a community in the Prince of Wales-Hyder Census Area of the U.S. state of Alaska.

As per Federal Aviation Administration records, the airport had 2,640 passenger boardings (enplanements) in calendar year 2008, 2,283 enplanements in 2009, and 2,608 in 2010. It is included in the National Plan of Integrated Airport Systems for 2011–2015, which categorized it as a non-primary commercial service airport (between 2,500 and 10,000 enplanements per year).

Facilities and aircraft 
Thorne Bay Seaplane Base has one seaplane landing area designated NW/SE  with a water surface measuring 5,000 by 2,000 feet (1,524 x 610 m). For the 12-month period ending December 31, 2006, the airport had 1,519 aircraft operations, an average of 126 per month: 49.4% air taxi, 42.4% scheduled commercial and 8.2% general aviation.

Airlines and destinations 
The following airlines offer scheduled passenger service:

References

External links 
 Topographic map from USGS The National Map

Airports in the Prince of Wales–Hyder Census Area, Alaska
Seaplane bases in Alaska